Lyford may refer to:

People
John Lyford
Ralph Lyford

Places
Lyford, Indiana, USA
Lyford, Oxfordshire, England
Lyford, Texas, USA
Lyford Cay, Bahamas
Mount Lyford, New Zealand

See also